Grizfolk is a Swedish-American alternative rock band consisting of Adam Roth (lead vocals, guitar), Sebastian Fritze (synthesizer, backing vocals), Fredrik Eriksson (guitar) and Bill Delia (drums). Based in Los Angeles with roots in Sweden, Grizfolk released their debut EP, From the Spark, in February 2014. Their debut full-length studio album, Waking Up the Giants, was released January 8, 2016.

History

Formation
Grizfolk formed in Los Angeles when Swedish producers Fredrik Eriksson and Sebastian Fritze met singer-songwriter Adam Roth in 2012, who were joined by Brendan Willing James and Bill Delia later that year. Initially, the group was called Griz Adams, but they quickly changed their name to Grizfolk after their demo for the song "The Struggle" went viral on the Internet, "something that better reflected what's supported us", Fritze explained.

Early career 
In October 2013, Grizfolk performed an in-studio performance for KCRW's Morning Becomes Eclectic. The Santa Monica-based station also championed Grizfolk as an "Artist You Should Know".
 The next day, they performed at KCRW's annual Masquerade Ball alongside Glasser, Dale Earnhardt Jr. Jr., Dave Sitek and more. In early 2014, their song "Way Back When" was featured on the soundtrack of the comic science fiction movie Mr. Peabody & Sherman.

From the Spark EP
Signed to Virgin Records in the fall of 2013, Grizfolk released their debut EP, From the Spark, in February 2014, including their single "The Struggle". It was followed by the band's first modern rock single, "Hymnals". Remix veteran RAC also released his version of "Hymnals", which rose to No. 1 on The Hype Machine. Other From the Spark remixes were released by Saint Pepsi, Tyde and Dawn Golden.

Media appearances

The group has done live performances on Late Show with David Letterman, Conan O'Brien, newspapers and a number of radio shows.

New releases

"In My Arms", June 2017 (Spotify, iTunes)

"Mercy", April 2019

Discography

Studio albums

Waking Up the Giants (January 2016)

Rarest of Birds (July 2019)

EPs

Indian Summer sampler (July 2013)

From the Spark (2014)

From the Road (December 2014)

Singles
"The Struggle" (October 2012)
"The Struggle" (December 2013)
"Hymnals" (2014)
"Way Back When" (2:47) (from Mr. Peabody & Sherman) (2014)
"Troublemaker" (3:29) / "Wide Awake" (from Waking Up The Giants) (2015) [#33 Alternative Songs]
"Endless Summer" (2018)
"Shaky in the Knees" (2018)
"Spoonful" (2019)
"Heavy Crown" (2019)
"Mercy" (2019)
"Money" (2020)
"Queen of the Desert" (2020)
"All I Want for Christmas is a Rock Show (feat. Kyle Gass)" (2020)
"California High" (2021)
"The  Ripple" (2021)
"Fumes" (2021)

Remixes
"Hymnals" (RAC Mix)
"Hymnals" (Saint Pepsi Remix)
"The Struggle" (RAC Mix)
"The Struggle" (Dawn Golden Remix)
"Vagabonds" (Tyde Remix)

Touring 
Grizfolk supported label mates Bastille on their European and U.S. tours in spring and fall of 2014 respectively, including two sold-out shows at Radio City Music Hall in New York City. Grizfolk has also toured with several other artists on the alternative circuit, including Haim and Wild Cub.

In early 2015, it was announced that the band would perform at the Boston Calling Music Festival in May 2015; a few weeks following the initial announcement the act withdrew from the festival.

The Black Bear Tour (August 2013)

Smoke and Mirrors Tour (November 2013)

The Good, the Bad Blood and the Ugly Tour (December 2013 – January 2014)

Last Love Tour (February – March 2014)

Bad Blood Part III Tour (March 2014)

Wild Cub Fall Tour (July – August 2014)

Bad Blood: The Last Stand Tour (October 2014)

The Vagabonds Tour (January – February 2015)

Lovetap! Tour (April – May 2015)

Summer Tour (June 2015)

Autumn Tour (September – November 2015) 

:Voodoo Music + Arts Experience

Troublemaker Tour (January – February 2016) 
On November 8, 2015, the band announced through the new mailing of their newsletter "Roadworthy" that they had finished work on their first full-length album Waking Up the Giants, that album pre-orders could be made from November 10, 2015 onwards and an accompanying headliner tour of which the pre-sale would also start on November 10, 2015. The band named this the Troublemaker Tour, after the lead single from Waking Up the Giants. Grizfolk played 26 shows in 21 different states, two different countries during a time span of 36 days.

References

External links
 

Alternative rock groups from California
Musical groups from Los Angeles
Musical groups established in 2012
Virgin Records artists